Softball has been an event at the Asian Games since 1990 in Beijing, China.

Summary

Medal table

Participating nations

List of medalists

References

Softball at the Asian Games

External links
Medallists from previous Asian Games - Softball

 
Sports at the Asian Games
Asian Games
Asian Games
Asian Games